Jenna Noelle Ushkowitz (born April 28, 1986) (born Min Ji []) is a South Korean-born American actress, singer, producer and podcast host. She is known for her performances in Broadway musicals such as The King and I and Waitress and in the role of Tina Cohen-Chang on the Fox musical comedy-drama series Glee, for which she received a Grammy Award nomination. She is a two-time Tony Award winner for her work as a producer of the Broadway musical Once on This Island and the Broadway play The Inheritance.

Early life
Born in Seoul, South Korea, Ushkowitz was adopted at the age of three months and raised in East Meadow, New York. Her mother Judi was a secretary turned housewife, and her father Brad was in transportation-industry sales. She has an older brother, Gregg. Her immediate adoptive family is Catholic, her adoptive paternal grandfather was Jewish. She attended elementary school at the Parkway School  in East Meadow, followed by Holy Trinity Diocesan High School, a Catholic school in Hicksville, Long Island. As a young child, she began her career in print advertisements, beginning with an ad for Playskool's Dress Me Up Ernie doll. She next did a Toys R Us television commercial, and went on to do three Burger King and Hess toy truck commercials each, and at ages 3, 6 and 11 did three Jell-O commercials starring comedian Bill Cosby.

During high school, Ushkowitz appeared in numerous musicals, including the first high school production of Les Misérables. Her other roles included Penny in Honk!, Inez in The Baker's Wife, Little Red Riding Hood in Into the Woods, and Romaine Patterson in The Laramie Project. Ushkowitz graduated from high school in 2004 and moved on to attend Marymount Manhattan College, where she once again took the role of Little Red Riding Hood in Into the Woods. She graduated from Marymount Manhattan in 2007 with a Bachelor of Arts in theatre arts, with a concentration in performance and a minor in musical theatre.

Career

At age 3, Ushkowitz began appearing on Sesame Street and other children's television shows. Her Broadway musical debut was in the 1996 revival of The King and I. Ushkowitz sang the American National Anthem at a New York Knicks game at Madison Square Garden when she was 13. Ushkowitz understudied the roles of Ilse, Anna, Martha, and Thea in the Broadway musical Spring Awakening in 2008. In 2009, Ushkowitz landed the role of Tina Cohen-Chang on Fox's musical comedy-drama series Glee. In casting Glee, series creator Ryan Murphy sought out actors who could identify with the rush of starring in theatrical roles. Instead of using traditional network casting calls, he spent three months on Broadway, where he found Ushkowitz. She was initially given a bit of information about Tina's back story, and believed that the character's stutter was real.

Ushkowitz's solos have included the songs "True Colors" by Cyndi Lauper, "I Follow Rivers" by Lykke Li, "Because You Loved Me" by Celine Dion, "Gangnam Style" by PSY, "I Don't Know How to Love Him" from the musical Jesus Christ Superstar, "Hung Up" by Madonna, and "I Kissed a Girl" by Katy Perry. Raymund Flandez of The Wall Street Journal hailed the "True Colors" cover as showcasing Ushkowitz's "strong crystalline voice". Gerrick D. Kennedy, writing for the Los Angeles Times, wrote that the "poignant" rendition was one of his "feel-good, tearjerker moments". The version charted at number 47 on the Australian Singles Chart, 38 on the Canadian Hot 100, 15 on the Irish Singles Chart, 35 on the UK Singles Chart, and 66 on the Billboard Hot 100. Rolling Stone journalist Erica Futterman wrote that her "Because You Loved Me" performance "removes some of the Lite FM softness embedded in the tune" and added that it was "really is great to see Tina get a song that suits her vocal abilities".

In both 2010 and 2011, Ushkowitz embarked on live concert tours with her Glee co-stars, with performances taking place in the United States, Canada, England, and Ireland. In 2011, Ushkowitz appeared briefly in Lady Gaga's music video for "Marry the Night", playing the role of Gaga's friend. Ushkowitz's autobiography, Choosing Glee, was released on May 14, 2013. During Glee fifth season, Ushkowitz's character graduated and was accepted into Brown University.

In August 2014, Ushkowitz was cast as Jeannie Ryan in the Hollywood Bowl production of Hair. Also in 2014, Ushkowitz was approached by fellow adoptee Samantha Futerman to found Kindred: The Foundation for Adoption, created to provide international and domestic adoptees and their families (both adoptive and biological) with services such as travel, translation, and support for those who wish to reunite. With the same spirit that made her create Kindred, in 2015, Ushkowitz executive produced the documentary Twinsters, a film showing the story that connected Samantha and Anaïs, identical twin sisters separated at birth. The film premiered at the 2015 South by Southwest. That same year, she was cast as the lead character, Julia Sullivan, in a special production of The Wedding Singer at the Pittsburgh Civic Light Opera. The play was initially set to last one week, but the positive response from critics and audiences extended its run.

In December 2015, it was announced that Ushkowitz had been cast as Marie the Nurse in the film adaptation of the musical Hello Again, alongside Nolan Gerard Funk, Audra McDonald, and Martha Plimpton. In 2016, Ushkowitz co-founded the podcast network At Will Radio with Will Malnati. The network debuted Infinitie Positivities, a show hosted by Ushkowitz that contains discussions of topics from her book Choosing Glee, and conversations with people who inspire her; guests include fellow actors, authors, and experts. In each episode, she talks about a new way to live life with a positive outlook.

Ushkowitz temporarily assumed the role of Dawn Williams from Kimiko Glenn in the Broadway production of Waitress, beginning performances July 29, 2016, and completing her run on October 19, 2016. She then appeared alongside Tracie Thoms and Rachel Dratch in Broadway's The 24 Hour Plays, with a performance on November 14, 2016. In 2018, she won a Tony Award for her role as a producer of that year's Best Revival of a Musical, Once on This Island. In 2020, she won a Tony Award for her role as a co-producer of that year's Best Play, The Inheritance.

In 2019 Ushkowitz and former Glee co-star Kevin McHale launched the podcast Showmance to discuss their on-screen and offline relationship. One of the most requested discussion topics of Season 1 of the podcast was their time on Glee. In season 2 they started an in-depth recap of Glee Season 1. Each episode of season 2 features McHale and Ushkowitz re-watching episodes of Glee and sharing behind-the-scenes secrets while also sharing personal sentiments and reflections about filming. The podcast is part of the LadyGang network on PodcastOne. The podcast started an indefinite hiatus in July 2020 following the death of Naya Rivera.

In September 2022, McHale and Ushkowitz announced their new podcast endeavor And That's What You Really Missed on iHeartRadio. Their rebranded and reimagined Glee recap podcast will start at the beginning, recapping and sharing memories from all six seasons of the show.

Activism and personal life
Besides her work with Kindred Foundation, Ushkowitz has advocated for several causes. In 2012, she posed with Glee co-star Kevin McHale for the NOH8 Campaign, supporting the repeal of Proposition 8 in California, which had previously banned same-sex marriages in the state. Ushkowitz has worked with NYCLASS and Oceana. A long time supporter of ocean conservation, Ushkowitz took a trip during summer of 2015 with Oceana to the Channel Islands, in order to raise awareness on the overfishing of forage fish and its effects on their survival. That same year, she hosted the 2015 Nautica Oceana Beach House event. She has made efforts to raise awareness about the declining population of sea lions in California, also caused by the overfishing of forage fish.

In August 2020, Ushkowitz announced her engagement to David Stanley. In May 2021, Ushkowitz celebrated her bachelorette party along with friend and Glee co-star Kevin McHale, who served as her "man of honor" during the ceremony. She and Stanley wed on July 24, 2021. On January 26, 2022, Ushkowitz announced on Instagram that she and Stanley are expecting their first child. In June 2022, she gave birth to their daughter, Emma.

Stage

As Actress

As Producer

Filmography

Television
As actress

As herself

Film

Music videos

Awards and nominations

References

External links

 
 
 

1986 births
20th-century American actresses
21st-century American singers
21st-century American actresses
Actresses from New York (state)
Actresses from Seoul
American actresses of Korean descent
American adoptees
American child actresses
American film actresses
American musical theatre actresses
American Roman Catholics
American stage actresses
American television actresses
South Korean adoptees
Living people
Marymount Manhattan College alumni
Singers from New York (state)
People from East Meadow, New York
Singers from Seoul
South Korean emigrants to the United States
21st-century American women singers